The Birch River is a  river in Aroostook County, Maine, in the United States. From the confluence of its North Branch and South Branch in the southwest corner of the town of Eagle Lake, the river runs southeast to St. Froid Lake in Winterville Plantation. The lake is drained by the Fish River, a tributary of the Saint John River.

See also
List of rivers of Maine

References

Maine Streamflow Data from the USGS
Maine Watershed Data From Environmental Protection Agency

Rivers of Aroostook County, Maine
Tributaries of the Saint John River (Bay of Fundy)
North Maine Woods